The Vermont Sports Hall of Fame is an athletics hall of fame in the U.S. state of Vermont.  Above all, induction "is for accomplishments in sports and recreation that generate a great source of pride to the state." Launched as a project in 2011, the Hall of Fame inducted its inaugural class on November 17, 2012. Inductees include multiple Olympic athletes and medalists, professional sports hall of fame inductees, and historical contributors from the state of Vermont or one of its colleges and universities.

Inductees

Class of 2012
Larry Benoit, outdoors
Jen Carlson, soccer
Ray Collins, baseball
Larry Gardner, baseball
Albert Gutterson, track & field
Bill Koch, Nordic skiing
Andrea Mead Lawrence, alpine skiing
John LeClair, ice hockey
Nicole Levesque Andres, basketball
Bob Yates, football
Tony Adams, contributor - media
Jake Burton Carpenter, contributor - snowboarding
Ken Squier, contributor - auto racing and media

Class of 2013
Charles Adams, historical pioneer
Barbara Cochran, alpine skiing
Keith Cieplicki, basketball
Ollie Dunlap, football
Ray Fisher, baseball
Edward Kehoe, contributor - outdoors
Billy Kidd, alpine skiing
Ralph LaPointe, baseball
Phil Latreille, ice hockey
Jean Robinson, contributor - coach
Gretchen Scheuermann, field hockey

Class of 2014
John Buffum, motor sports
Bob Cochran, alpine skiing
Marilyn Cochran, alpine skiing
Michael D. Gallagher, Nordic skiing/running
Ted Hoehn, tennis
Jade Huntington, basketball
George Jacobs, contributor - coach/athletic director
Ernie Johnson, baseball
Mae Murray Jones, golf
Judi St. Hilaire, track & field/running
James P. Taylor, historical inductee - outdoors

Class of 2015
Shelly Addison Smith, soccer
Carl Christensen, soccer
Bobby Dragon, stock car racing
Mona Garone, contributor - coach
Tom Lawson, contributor - coach/administrator
Jack Leggett, multisport athlete/contributor - coach
Jim McCaffrey, basketball
Kirk McCaskill, baseball/ice hockey
Bev Osterberg, contributor - coach
Matha Rockwell, Nordic skiing
Laura Wilson Todd, Nordic skiing
Fred Harris, historical inductee - outdoors/ski jumping

Class of 2017
John H. Caldwell, Nordic skiing
Bernie Cieplicki Sr., basketball - athlete/coach
Lindy Cochran, alpine skiing
Tad Coffin, equestrian
Clarence DeMar, distance running/historical pioneer
Don Fillion, media - sportswriter
Missy Foote, field hockey/lacrosse
Guy Gaudreau, ice hockey/soccer
Ed Markey, basketball/administrator
Tony Robitaille, boxing
Martha Rockwell, Nordic skiing
Betsy Snite, alpine skiing

Class of 2018
Tim Caldwell, Nordic skiing
Robbie Crouch, stock car racing
Hilary Engisch Klein, moguls skiing
Ray Frey, track & field - coach
Matt Johnson, basketball
Larry Killick, basketball
Melba Masse, athlete/contributor/coach
David Morse, contributor - Mal Boright Media inductee
Bobby Mitchell, football
Jen Niebling, basketball
Martin St. Louis, ice hockey

Class of 2019
Ann Battelle, moguls skiing
Bill Beaney, ice hockey
Elizabeth Burnham, softball
Larry Damon, Nordic skiing
Harmon 'Beaver' Dragon, stock car racing
Jenny Everett, field hockey
Layne Higgs, basketball
Jeff Hughes, football
Ross Powers, snowboarding
Holly Reynolds, golf
Tiger Shaw, alpine skiing
Richard Tarrant, basketball

Class of 2020
Tara Chaplin, track & field
Jim Cross, ice hockey
Toby Ducolon, ice hockey
Debbie Dunkley, gymnastics
Jeff Hastings, ski jumping
Ed Hockenbury, basketball
Tom Pierce, golf
Sarah Schreib, basketball
Libby Smith, golf/basketball
Carol Weston, hockey/soccer/track & field

Class of 2022
The hall's 2022 inductees included:

Jayne Barber, basketball
Taylor Coppenrath, basketball
Stan Dunklee, Nordic skiing
Cathy Inglese, basketball
Bill O'Neil, ice hockey/soccer/softball
Erin Sullivan Lane, cross country/track & field
Tim Thomas, ice hockey

Class of 2023
The 2023 inductees were:

Suzy Chaffee, Olympic alpine skier
Kelly Clark, Olympic snowboarder
Lea Davison, Olympic mountain biker
Jake Eaton, college football standout
David Fredrickson, high school basketball coach
Jasmyn Huntington Fletcher, high school and college basketball player
John Koerner, high school soccer player
Doug Lewis, Olympic alpine skier
Bob Molinatti, para-athlete
Morgan Valley, basketball player and coach

David Hakins Memorial Inductee
The David Hakins Memorial Inductee award is given to a person, business leader or organization that demonstrates exceptional promotion and development of sports, athletics and recreation in the state of Vermont. The award is named in memory of the late David Hakins, a Vermont businessman who was a founding member of the Vermont Sports Hall of Fame and first president of its board of directors.

2013: Ray Pecor Jr., former owner of the Vermont Lake Monsters
2014: Tom Curley, motor sports contributor/former owner of Thunder Road International SpeedBowl
2015: Ernie Farrar, Vermont Golden Gloves
2017: Helmut Lenes, mountain climbing/outdoors
2019: Mal Boright, sports journalist
2020: Mickey and Ginny Cochran, alpine skiing
2020: Ted Ryan, sports journalist
2023: Thomas Dunkley, gymnastics pioneer

Mal Boright media inductee
The Mal Boright award for excellence in sports journalism honors Boright's five decades of covering Vermont sports and his role as a founder of the Vermont Sports Hall of Fame in 2011.

2023: Andy Gardiner, sportswriter

References

External links
 - Vermont Sports Hall of Fame Website

Sports in Vermont
State sports halls of fame in the United States
All-sports halls of fame
Halls of fame in Vermont